The 2021 Britcar Trophy Championship (known for sponsorship reasons as the 2021 Goodyear Britcar Trophy Championship) is a motor racing championship for production cars held across England. The Trophy championship was created specifically for production vehicles as a Britcar championship separate from the much faster GT and Touring Cars of the Endurance Championship. It will be the 20th season of a Britcar championship and the 2nd Britcar Trophy Championship season. The season began on 28 March at Silverstone Circuit and end on 14 November at Brands Hatch.

The championship includes Class 1, 2 and 3 cars, formerly Classes 5, 6 and 7. The Michelin Clio Cup Series also joined the Britcar Trophy Championship grid with the Clio cars having a separate class but still eligible to compete for the overall championship title.

Calendar

Teams and drivers
All teams are British-registered.
{|
|

Race Results
Bold indicates overall winner.

Overall championship standings

Points are awarded as follows in all classes:

† – Drivers did not finish the race, but were classified as they completed over 60% of the race distance and were awarded half points.

Class championship standings

Points are awarded as follows in all classes:

† – Drivers did not finish the race, but were classified as they completed over 60% of the race distance and were awarded half points.

Notes

References

External links

Britcar
Britcar
Britcar Trophy Championship seasons